Frederick Enoil Soucy (born February 13, 1922) is a Canadian former politician. He served in the Legislative Assembly of New Brunswick from 1963 to 1967 as a Liberal member from the constituency of Madawaska.

References

1922 births
Possibly living people